The 2017 Australian Football International Cup (also known as the AFL International Cup 2017 or IC07) was the sixth edition of the Australian Football International Cup, a triennial international Australian rules football competition run by the Australian Football League (AFL).

It was contested between 5–19 August 2017, with games played in Melbourne. All three previous men's tournament champions (Ireland, New Zealand and Papua New Guinea) participated in the tournament. Previous women's winners (Ireland and Canada) also competed in the tournament. Papua New Guinea achieved its 3rd men's title and Ireland achieved its 2nd women's title.

Background

Teams
The 2017 AFL International Cup was played in Melbourne from 5 to 19 August, with 18 men's teams and eight women's teams competing.

 Men's teams: Canada, China, Croatia,† Fiji, France, Germany,† Great Britain, India, Indonesia, Ireland, Japan, Nauru, New Zealand, Pakistan, Papua New Guinea, South Africa, Sri Lanka,† USA.
 Women's teams: Canada, European Crusaders,† Fiji, Great Britain,† Ireland, Pakistan,† Papua New Guinea,† USA.

† Team made their tournament debut

The European Crusaders was a combined team made up of women from Britain, Croatia, France, Germany, Ireland, Italy, Poland and Sweden.

In the table below, the numbers in parentheses refer to the team's Unofficial World Rankings by World Footy News prior to the competition.

Men's

Women's

Format
For the first time, the men's fixture was played across two divisions. Division One played four matches against other teams within the division and were ranked from one to ten, with finals to follow between the top two placed teams on the ladder, the third and fourth placed teams, and so on.

The men's Division Two competition and the women's competition saw teams split into two pools of four with each team playing matches against the three opponents in their pool before competing in semi-finals and grand finals based on finishing positions within the pool.

The women's grand final was played at Etihad Stadium as a curtain-raiser to the Round 22 clash between Carlton and Hawthorn. The men's grand final was played at the Melbourne Cricket Ground as a curtain-raiser to the Round 22 match between Collingwood and Geelong.

Venues
The majority of the matches were played at Royal Park in the Melbourne suburb of Parkville. The inclusion of a "Community Round" allowed matches to be played as curtain-raisers to local suburban, amateur and country matches. Additionally, the International Cup introduced a "School Round" to be played on 9 August, with games played at suburban and country schools.

Fixtures for the tournament were released by the AFL on 18 July 2017.

Men's tournament

Division 1

Ladder

Pool Play

Finals

Division II

Pool A

Pool B

Play-Offs

Final standings

Women's Tournament 

 
 
 
 
  European Crusaders

Pool A

Pool B

Play-Offs

World Teams

Men's World Team

Women's World Team

See also
 Australian Football League
 Australian Football International Cup
 Australian rules football around the world

References

Australian Football International Cup
International